Kate Lester (born Sarah Cody, 12 June 1857 – 12 October 1924) was an American theatrical and silent film actress. Her family, the Suydams of New York, were staying in Britain at the time of her birth.

Early life
Lester was brought up in New York City and educated in the most exclusive schools. After completing normal school she studied dramatic art, which was the custom of the time. She learned drama from Dion Boucicault, a famed instructor.

Stage and film actress

Lester was a beauty of the stage in the late 19th century. Later she began to play maternal characters in films. It was as a grand dame
that she made her debut on the New York stage. The woman scheduled to play Lady Silverdale in Partners became ill on the eve of the premiere. During Lester's stage career she acted with Richard Mansfield, John Drew Jr., William H. Crane, Mrs. Fiske, Robert B. Mantell, Henrietta Crosman, Julia Marlowe, Margaret Anglin and even James J Corbett.

Her first silent features were in 1916. The film titles are Molly Make-Believe, Destiny's Toy, The Social Secretary, The Kiss, and A Coney Island Princess. Lester's last films were released in 1925. They are The Meddler, Raffles, the Amateur Cracksman, and The Price of Pleasure.
She attained initial success in emotional roles. She began to develop her grand dame line of characters when her hair turned white prematurely.

Death
Lester, at age 67, died from burns she sustained during an explosion inside her dressing room at Universal Studios in Hollywood in 1924. She was taken to Hollywood Hospital where she succumbed from burns to her hair, face, hands and upper body. She was taken to the emergency room unconscious. Studio personnel broke down the door to her dressing room.
It was suspected that the connections to a gas stove in Lester's dressing room had been leaking. When she attempted to light the gas, an explosion followed.

Lester's body was removed to the J. W. Todd undertaking establishment in Culver City, California and cremated at Rosedale cemetery. In private life she was Mrs. Sarah Cody, and at the time of her death she resided at 7131 Bagley Avenue, Culver City.

Filmography

Molly Make-Believe (1916)
Destiny's Toy (1916)
The Reward of Patience (1916)
The Social Secretary (1916)
The Kiss (1916)
A Coney Island Princess (1916)
The Fortunes of Fifi (1917)
God's Man (1917)
Darkest Russia (1917)
To-Day (1917)
The Divorce Game (1917)
Betsy Ross (1917)
Adventures of Carol (1917)
The Good for Nothing (1917)
The Volunteer (1917)
The Unbeliever (1918)
Broken Ties (1918)
His Royal Highness (1918)
The Way Out (1918)
The Cross Bearer (1918)
The Reason Why (1918)
The Heart of a Girl (1918)
Annexing Bill (1918)
The Golden Wall (1918)
Doing Their Bit (1918)
Little Women (1918)
The Love Net (1918)
The Crook of Dreams (1919)
The Hand Invisible (1919)
A Man and His Money (1919)
The Stronger Vow (1919)
The City of Comrades (1919)
The Crimson Gardenia (1919)
The Solitary Sin (1919)
The City of Comrades (1919)
Through the Wrong Door (1919)
Upstairs (1919)
Lord and Lady Algy (1919)
Bonds of Love (1919)
The Gay Lord Quex (1919)
The Cup of Fury (1920)
The Paliser Case (1920)
The Woman in Room 13 (1920)
Simple Souls (1920)
Stop Thief! (1920)
Earthbound (1920)
Officer 666 (1920)
Made in Heaven (1921)
Don't Neglect Your Wife (1921)
Oh Mary Be Careful (1921)
Dangerous Curve Ahead (1921)
The Hole in the Wall (1921)
The Beautiful Liar (1921)
The Fourteenth Lover (1922)
Rose o' the Sea (1922)
A Tailor-Made Man (1922)
The Eternal Flame (1922)
Remembrance (1922)
One Week of Love (1922)
Quincy Adams Sawyer (1922)
The Glorious Fool (1922)
Gimme (1923) as Mrs. Roland Ferris
Can a Woman Love Twice? (1923)
The Fourth Musketeer (1923)
Modern Matrimony (1923)
Her Accidental Husband (1923)
The Love Trap (1923)
The Hunchback of Notre Dame (1923)
The Wild Party (1923)
The Marriage Market (1923)
The Rendezvous (1923)
The Satin Girl (1923)
Black Oxen (1923)
Leave It to Gerry (1924)
The Beautiful Sinner (1924)
The Goldfish (1924)
Beau Brummel (1924)
The Beautiful Sinner (1924)
Wife of the Centaur (1924)
The Price of Pleasure (1925)
Raffles, the Amateur Cracksman (1925)
The Meddler (1925)

References

The Los Angeles Times, Mother in Film World Is Burned, 12 October 1924, Page 12.
The Los Angeles Times, Actress in Films Dies From Burns, 13 October 1924, Page A2.
Oakland, California Tribune, Veteran Actress Badly Burned in Mystery Blast at Movie Studio, Sunday, 12 October 1924, Page 1.

External links

Kate Lester theatre images(Univ. of Washington, Sayre collection)

1857 births
1924 deaths
Accidental deaths in California
19th-century American actresses
20th-century American actresses
American expatriates in the United Kingdom
Deaths from fire in the United States